Prunus incana, the willow leaf cherry (and hoary cherry, although that name is also used for Prunus canescens), is a species of sour cherry native to the Caucasus region of central Asia, including Russia, Armenia, Georgia, Turkey and possibly Iran. A scrubby plant, it tends to grow on limestone cliffs at elevations around 360-2400m.

Uses
Prunus incana is used as a rootstock for peach, Prunus persica.

References

External links
 

incana
Flora of the Caucasus
Flora of Iran
Flora of Turkey
Plants described in 1801